ASC Xam-Xam is a Senegalese football club based in Dakar, which is a member of the Senegal National League 1 (third tier).

History
In 2008 they played in the Senegal Premier League the top division in Senegalese football. Their home stadium is Stade Demba Diop.

Current squad

Notes

Football clubs in Senegal
Sports clubs in Dakar
2001 establishments in Senegal